Love's the Place to Be is the fourth studio album by the American soul musician Will Downing, released by Mercury Records in 1993 in the United States. His first album for the label, it peaked at number 166 on the US Billboard 200. "There's No Living Without You" peaked at number 67 on the UK Singles Chart.

Production
Among the album's many producers were Barry Eastmond and Ronnie Foster. Stevie Wonder contributed harmonica to "That's All". Rachelle Ferrell duets with Downing on "Nothing Has Ever Felt Like This".

Critical reception

AllMusic editor Jason Birchmeier rated the album three out of five stars and wrote that "these songs were all some of Downing's best work ... showcasing his vocal prowess." The Atlanta Journal-Constitution called the album "the kind of romantic, elegant material that fans of the highly touted Luther Vandross wish he would return to." The Charlotte Observer deemed it "a masterpiece," writing that "the three-song suite 'Do You Still Love Me'/'Hey Girl'/'Break Up to Make Up' is one of the best things to hit CD in a long time." The Dallas Morning News thought that "Downing has matured into a stunning stylist, caressing such classics as Nat 'King' Cole's 'That's All' [and] the Stylistics' 'Break Up to Make Up' ... with a reverence that still leaves room for redefining." The Daily Breeze wrote that "most of the 11 tracks spin at the same speed and intensity, thus there is no chance for the highs and lows."

Track listing

Selected personnel

Will Downing – vocals
Gerald Albright – saxophone
Rachelle Ferrell – vocals
Anthony Jackson – bass

Harvey Mason – drums
Marion Meadows – saxophone
Buddy Wilson – drums
Stevie Wonder – harmonica

Charts

References

1993 albums
Mercury Records albums
Will Downing albums